Robert McDonald Watt (June 24, 1927 – May 11, 2010) was a Canadian ice hockey player. He was a member of the Edmonton Mercurys that won a gold medal at the 1952 Winter Olympics in Oslo, Norway.

Awards and honors

External links
Bob Watt's profile at databaseOlympics
Bob Watt's obituary

1927 births
2010 deaths
People from Red Deer County
Ice hockey players at the 1952 Winter Olympics
Olympic gold medalists for Canada
Olympic ice hockey players of Canada
Olympic medalists in ice hockey
Medalists at the 1952 Winter Olympics
Ice hockey people from Alberta
Canadian ice hockey right wingers
AHCA Division I men's ice hockey All-Americans